The Hong Kong cricket team toured Scotland in September 2016 to play two One Day International (ODI) matches at The Grange, Edinburgh, which was named as The Braidwood Cup. Scotland won the series 1–0.

Squads

ODI series

1st ODI

2nd ODI

References

External links
 Series home at ESPN Cricinfo

2016 in Hong Kong cricket
2016 in Scottish cricket
September 2016 sports events in the United Kingdom
International cricket competitions in 2016
Hong Kong cricket tours of Scotland